"The Rising" is a song by American metal band Trivium. It was released as the fourth single from the band's third studio album The Crusade. The song was the band's first charting single in the US, peaking at number 32 on the Billboard Mainstream Rock Chart.

Reception and legacy
At the time of The Crusade's release, "The Rising" received positive reviews from critics. 

Thom Jurek of AllMusic called "The Rising" one the album's notable tracks, while Don Kaye of Blabbermouth.net called the song one of the best on the album.

In an interview with Metal Injection to coincide with the release of The Sin and the Sentence in 2017, vocalist/guitarist Matt Heafy, guitarist Corey Beaulieu, and bassist Paolo Gregoletto all cited "The Rising" as their least favorite Trivium song. Gregoletto stated that the song was a last minute addition to the album that was written in a style similar to previous single "Anthem (We Are the Fire)" and the inclusion of "The Rising" caused the song "Broken One" to be left off of the album; "Broken One" was released as a b-side to the "Anthem" single and as a bonus track on the iTunes edition of The Crusade. Heafy stated that he felt the song was incomplete and Beaulieu stated the band should not have done the song or should have worked on it some more.

Music video
The song's music video was directed by Artificial Army.

The video primarily consists of shots of the band performing in a warehouse while a woman, a man dressed like a police officer, and another man separately watch the band perform on a TV. As the song's solo begins, the shadows of the three characters act on their own. The woman's shadow is shown arguing with a man, the officer's shadow hints at him serving in a war, while the other man's shadow is shown arguing with itself. As the song ends, the three characters leave the room they are in, with their shadows being sucked into the TV.

Track listing
American promo single

European promo single

Charts

Personnel
Matt Heafy – lead vocals, rhythm guitar
Corey Beaulieu – lead guitar
Paolo Gregoletto – bass, backing vocals
Travis Smith – drums

References

External links
Official Music Video at YouTube

2006 songs
2007 singles
Trivium (band) songs
Roadrunner Records singles
Songs written by Matt Heafy
Songs written by Paolo Gregoletto